Carlos Roberto Massa Júnior (born 19 April 1981), best known as Ratinho Júnior, is a Brazilian politician and the son of television host and former politician Ratinho. Ratinho Júnior is the current governor of the state of Paraná, having won the 2018 election.

References

1981 births
Living people
People from Jandaia do Sul
Brazilian Socialist Party politicians
Social Christian Party (Brazil) politicians
Social Democratic Party (Brazil, 2011) politicians
Cidadania politicians
Members of the Chamber of Deputies (Brazil) from Paraná
Governors of Paraná (state)